The 1917 Kentucky Derby was the 43rd running of the Kentucky Derby. The race took place on May 12, 1917. Winner Omar Khayyam, foaled in England, was the first foreign bred horse to win the Derby.

Full results

Winning Breeder: Sir John Robinson; (England)
Horses Penrod, Diamond, and Sol Gilsey scratched before the race

Payout

 The winner received a purse of $16,600.
 Second place received $2,500.
 Third place received $1,000.
 Fourth place received $275.

References

1917
Kentucky Derby
Derby
1917 in American sports
May 1917 sports events